Polyspora axillaris (Chinese: 大頭茶, literally "big head tea") is a species of evergreen trees or shrubs that can grow up to 9 m tall. It has been given the name "Fried Egg Plant" for its white and yellow flower.
P. axillaris is found in Southern China, including Hong Kong and Hainan. Is also grows in the wild in Taiwan and Vietnam, and is a garden tree all over the world.

While earlier grouped under Gordonia, the genus Polyspora has been found to be not closely related to the North American species, thus transferring the species to its own genus.

Description
Polyspora axillaris grows on hillsides, and is adapted to holding on to slopes while being exposed to rain and storms. Its brown bark peels off in rather large smooth pieces. The fruit superficially resembles the green part of an acorn.

The flowers are rather big, with five white petals, and many yellow anthers. They are fragrant and attract bees and butterflies.
Some flowers grow in the leaf axils, leading to its scientific name, P. axillaris. The flower will fall off the tree before wilting.

Distribution
Polyspora axillaris is normally found in forests and thickets at elevations of 100 – 800 m, but has been found at elevations up to 2300 m. It occurs in Guangdong, Guangxi, Hainan, Taiwan and Hong Kong.

In Hong Kong, it is common on hillsides, such as those of Lion Rock.

Gallery

References

Theaceae
Trees of Hong Kong